12th BSFC Awards
December 26, 1991

Best Film: 
 The Silence of the Lambs 
The 12th Boston Society of Film Critics Awards honored the best filmmaking of 1991.

Winners
Best Film:
The Silence of the Lambs
Runner-up: JFK
Best Actor:
Nick Nolte – The Prince of Tides
Runner-up: Robin Williams - The Fisher King
Best Actress:
Geena Davis – Thelma & Louise
Runner-up: Jodie Foster - The Silence of the Lambs
Best Supporting Actor:
Anthony Hopkins – The Silence of the Lambs
Runner-up: Harvey Keitel - Bugsy
Best Supporting Actress:
Mercedes Ruehl – The Fisher King
Runner-up: Juliette Lewis - Cape Fear
Best Director:
Jonathan Demme – The Silence of the Lambs
Runner-up: Oliver Stone - JFK
Best Screenplay:
David Cronenberg – Naked Lunch
Runner-up: Ted Tally - The Silence of the Lambs
Best Cinematography:
Tak Fujimoto – The Silence of the Lambs
Best Documentary:
Paris Is Burning
Best Foreign-Language Film:
Europa Europa • Germany/France/Poland

External links
Past Winners

References 
`Silence of Lambs' scores big with Boston critics The Boston Globe
1991 Boston Society of Film Critics Awards Internet Movie Database

1991
1991 film awards
1991 awards in the United States
1991 in Boston
December 1991 events in the United States